Robert Errey (born September 21, 1964) is a Canadian former professional ice hockey left wing and current sportscaster for the Pittsburgh Penguins of the National Hockey League (NHL). He was drafted 15th overall by Pittsburgh in the 1983 NHL Entry Draft and played 895 NHL games over the course of his career.

Playing career 
Errey was born in Montreal, Quebec. As a youth, he played in the 1977 Quebec International Pee-Wee Hockey Tournament with a minor ice hockey team from Peterborough, Ontario.

Errey played junior ice hockey with the Peterborough Petes of the Ontario Hockey League from 1980 to 1983. During that time he teamed with Steve Yzerman to form the top line, and led the team in goals with 53 in 1983. Errey would eventually reunite with Yzerman in Detroit for one full season and two half seasons in the mid 1990s.

Errey played most notably for the Pittsburgh Penguins, but also played for the Buffalo Sabres, San Jose Sharks, Detroit Red Wings, Dallas Stars and New York Rangers. He won two Stanley Cups as a member of the Penguins in 1991 and 1992. He was also a member of Team Canada in 1997 winning a gold medal at the World Championships and appeared in the 1995 Stanley Cup Finals with Detroit. With the Penguins, he originally wore jersey #10 then settled with #12. He retired in 1999 after playing the entire 1998–99 season with the Hartford Wolf Pack of the American Hockey League.

Errey served as the captain of the San Jose Sharks for the 1993–94 NHL season and part of the 1994–95 season.

Broadcast career 
Errey is currently the TV colour analyst for the Pittsburgh Penguins broadcasts on AT&T SportsNet Pittsburgh alongside Steve Mears.  He also appeared as an analyst on the NHL Network's nightly highlight show, NHL on the Fly during the 2007 Stanley Cup Playoffs. He occasionally appears on TSN as an analyst during the network's coverage of the IIHF World Hockey Championships.

Personal life 
Errey was born in Montreal, grew up in Peterborough, Ontario, and attended Crestwood Secondary School.
 
Errey and his wife Tracy have two sons, Connor and Chad. 

Errey is a cousin of the Indy Champ, Tom Geoghegan of the Kinloch racing team and a third cousin to hockey legend Ted Lindsay.

Awards 
Stanley Cup
 Pittsburgh Penguins – 1991, 1992

Career statistics

Regular season and playoffs

International

External links

References

1964 births
Living people
Anglophone Quebec people
Baltimore Skipjacks players
Buffalo Sabres players
Canadian ice hockey left wingers
Canadian television sportscasters
Dallas Stars players
Detroit Red Wings players
Hartford Wolf Pack players
Ice hockey people from Ontario
Ice hockey people from Montreal
National Hockey League broadcasters
National Hockey League first-round draft picks
New York Rangers players
Peterborough Petes (ice hockey) players
Pittsburgh Penguins announcers
Pittsburgh Penguins draft picks
Pittsburgh Penguins players
San Jose Sharks players
Sportspeople from Peterborough, Ontario
Stanley Cup champions